Nikolay Serafimovich Bazhukov (born July 23, 1953 in Troitsko-Pechorsk, Komi ASSR) is a Soviet/Russian cross-country skier who competed from 1976 to 1980. He won the 15 km gold and the 4 × 10 km relay bronze at the 1976 Winter Olympics in Innsbruck, then followed it with a 4 × 10 km relay gold at the 1980 Winter Olympics in Lake Placid, New York. Bazhukov trained at the Armed Forces sports society.

Cross-country skiing results
All results are sourced from the International Ski Federation (FIS).

Olympic Games
 3 medals – (2 gold, 1 bronze)

World Championships

References

External links
 
 
 
 
 Biography 

1953 births
Living people
Soviet male cross-country skiers
Olympic cross-country skiers of the Soviet Union
Cross-country skiers at the 1976 Winter Olympics
Cross-country skiers at the 1980 Winter Olympics
Olympic gold medalists for the Soviet Union
Olympic bronze medalists for the Soviet Union
Armed Forces sports society athletes
Olympic medalists in cross-country skiing
Medalists at the 1976 Winter Olympics
Medalists at the 1980 Winter Olympics